Massachusetts House of Representatives' 6th Suffolk district in the United States is one of 160 legislative districts included in the lower house of the Massachusetts General Court. It covers part of the city of Boston in Suffolk County. Democrat Russell Holmes of Mattapan has represented the district since 2011.

The current district geographic boundary overlaps with those of the Massachusetts Senate's Norfolk and Suffolk district, 1st Suffolk district, and 2nd Suffolk district.

Representatives
 John A. Andrew, circa 1858 
 George P. Clapp, circa 1858 
 Martin Brimmer, 1859-1861 
 Thornton K. Lothrop, circa 1859 
 Harvey Newton Collison, circa 1888 
 Edward J. Flynn, circa 1888 
 Cornelius J. Driscoll, circa 1920 
 James William Hayes, circa 1920 
 Patrick J. Melody, circa 1920 
 John Taylor Tynan, circa 1951 
 Elaine Noble, 1977-1979 
 Shirley Owens-Hicks
 Willie Mae Allen, 2007-2011
 Russell E. Holmes, 2011-current

See also
 List of Massachusetts House of Representatives elections
 Other Suffolk County districts of the Massachusetts House of Representatives: 1st, 2nd, 3rd, 4th, 5th, 7th, 8th, 9th, 10th, 11th, 12th, 13th, 14th, 15th, 16th, 17th, 18th, 19th
 List of Massachusetts General Courts
 List of former districts of the Massachusetts House of Representatives

Images
Portraits of legislators

References

External links
 Ballotpedia
  (State House district information based on U.S. Census Bureau's American Community Survey).
 League of Women Voters of Boston

House
Government of Suffolk County, Massachusetts